General elections were held in Monaco on 15 January 1978. The result was a victory for the National and Democratic Union, which won all 18 seats in the National Council.

Results

By party

References

Elections in Monaco
Monaco
1978 in Monaco
Monaco